{{DISPLAYTITLE:Ammonia (13N)}}

Ammonia (13N) (ammonia with radioisotope nitrogen-13) is a medication for diagnostic positron emission tomography (PET) imaging of the myocardium.

References

External links 
 

Radiopharmaceuticals